Legend of the Blademasters is a cancelled role-playing video game from Ripcord Games.

Development
The game was in development by Ronin Entertainment a company founded in 1994 by several former LucasArts employees. Environments in the game were inspired by the classic animation of the famous director Hayao Miyazaki, such as Nausicaa, Laputa, and Princess Mononoke.

The title was scheduled to release in August 1999. This was pushed to the first quarter of 2000 and later to 2001.

References

Cancelled Windows games
Cancelled Dreamcast games
Ripcord Games games
Ronin Entertainment games